Muran District is in Germi County, Ardabil province, Iran. At the 2006 census, its population was 12,964 in 2,556 households. The following census in 2011 counted 11,124 people in 2,723 households. At the latest census in 2016, the district had 10,019 inhabitants living in 2,931 households.

References 

Germi County

Districts of Ardabil Province

Populated places in Ardabil Province

Populated places in Germi County